Oberlin Township is a township in Decatur County, Kansas, USA.  As of the 2000 census, its population was 91.

Geography

The streams of North Fork Sappa Creek and South Fork Sappa Creek run through this township.

References
 USGS Geographic Names Information System (GNIS)

External links
 US-Counties.com
 City-Data.com

Townships in Decatur County, Kansas
Townships in Kansas